Anu Malhotra is an Indian filmmaker on the subject of travel and expedition. She has written, directed, and hosted many television series, programs, films, and advertisement films for the Department of Tourism in India. She has led the Incredible India campaign for filming and cinematographic presentation. Documentaries that showcase the cultures and traditions of India such as the Apatani of Arunachal Pradesh, the Konyak of Nagaland, and "The Maharaja of Jodhpur–Legacy lives on" have been created by her. Her latest production which premiered in October 2010, is on shamanism in Himachal Pradesh, entitled "Shamans of the Himalayas".

Awards and recognition
Best Tourism Promotional, Department of Tourism, 2002.
Best National Tourism Film by the Ministry of Tourism, 2001
Udyog Rattan Award for 2001.
Best National Tourism Film by the Ministry of Tourism, 2000.
Premio Televisino internationazionle Award (Italy) 1999.
Travel and Tourism Promoter's Award, 1998.
Best National Tourism Film by the Ministry of Tourism, 1997.
Best National Tourism Film, by the Ministry of Tourism, 1996.
Onida Pinnacle Award in Best Director in non-fiction, 1995.
Onida Pinnacle Award for Best coverage of a live event, 1995.
Lions Club, Bombay Award for Best Travelogue on Television, 1995.

Filmography

Anu has also worked on several other documentaries and films a collection of which named 'Tribal Wisdom' was telecasted on Discovery Channel International, France 5, Al Jazeera, Twin Rambler and Tung Hoa during the years 2002–2009. This series was all about the tradition, customs and life of tribes in India, in this there were different films put together to present as a series namely The Rabaris of Gujarat, The Irulas of Tamil Nadu, The Khasis of Meghalaya, The Nicobarese of Car Nicobar, The Baigas of Madhya Pradesh, as well as The Apatani of Arunachal Pradesh and The Konyak of Nagaland.

References

External links

Indian documentary filmmakers
Indian women film directors
People from New Delhi
1972 births
Living people
Film directors from Delhi
Women artists from Delhi
20th-century Indian film directors
21st-century Indian film directors
Indian television directors
20th-century Indian women artists
21st-century Indian women artists
Indian women documentary filmmakers
Nari Shakti Puraskar 2018 winners
Indian women television directors